Elkins High School may refer to:

Elkins High School (Arkansas) — Elkins, Arkansas
Elkins High School (Texas) — Missouri City, Texas
Elkins High School (West Virginia) — Elkins, West Virginia